Solanum pseudoquina is a species of plant in the family Solanaceae. It is endemic to Brazil. A rare plant, it is dependent on conservation of its habitat to prevent it from becoming a threatened species.

S. inaequale as described by da Conceição Vellozo is an invalid name for this plant that is sometimes still seen. Altogether, the following synonyms are assigned to this species:
 Cyphomandra flagrans (Ten.) Walp.
 Pionandra flagrans (Ten.) Miers
 Solanum flagrans Ten.
 Solanum inaequale Vell. (nonHornem.: preoccupied)
S. inaequale Hornem. is S. lanceolatum Cav.. S. inaequale C.Presl is S. lanceifolium Jacq..
 Solanum leiophyllum Dunal (non Benth.: preoccupied)
 Solanum pseudochina Spreng.
 Solanum ramosissimum Dunal
 Solanum undatifolium Dunal

Footnotes

References
  (2004): Solanum pseudoquina. Version of July 2004. Retrieved 2008-SEP-30.

pseudoquina
Flora of Brazil
Conservation dependent plants
Taxonomy articles created by Polbot
Taxobox binomials not recognized by IUCN